Mouna Bassili Sehnaoui (born 1945) is a Lebanese painter, writer and artist.

Biography
Born in Egypt, Lebanese artist Mouna Bassili Sehnaoui attended the American University of Beirut and the University of Arizona, where she studied Fine Arts.
Sehnaoui works in a variety of formats ranging from painting, writing, design and sculpture. She has had solo exhibitions in Paris, Dubai, and Beirut. Sehnaoui currently lives and works in Beirut with husband Marwan, President of the Lebanese Order of Malta and sons Salim Sehnaoui and Khalil Sehnaoui.

In the seventies, Bassili Sehnaoui was in charge of the Graphic Art Department of the Lebanese National Council of Tourism. She also produced designs for stamps, packaging, posters, and book illustrations and created films for the Lebanese public television station. She later learned painting and typography, two disciplines she taught in Lebanese universities.

Her style is influenced by a Middle Eastern cultural heritage as reflected in the flat treatment of colours in both Byzantine icons and Persian miniatures. The treatment of space is very personal and brings a new dimension to a figurative approach by the use of hieroglyphic –like symbols and “windows” that open to reveal an added aspect of the subject treated.

Since the early 1990s, she has produced albums of lithographs based on Phoenician legends and studied porcelain painting, while still working as a designer and illustrator. Bassili Sehnaoui has been exhibiting art since the mid-sixties. Her seemingly naïve paintings most often reference her own surroundings, her country and its cultural heritage. The works suggest a very personal interpretation of space where shapes and line interpenetrate in colourful harmonies.

Work
Her work has won several Prizes and figures in the Museum of Prints, Alexandria; the Sursock Museum, Beirut; the Art Collection of the American University of Beirut; the Bank Audi Art Collection as well as many private collections around the world.

Sehnaoui also designed the famous Lebanon logo, now widely used, for the Ministry of Culture in the 1960s, as well as several posters encouraging tourism in the country. 

She is also known for her paintings depicting the Lebanese civil war.

Solo exhibitions
1971 J.F. Kennedy Center, Beirut, Lebanon
1980 Epreuve D’Artiste Gallery, Beirut, Lebanon
1987 Epreuve D’Artiste Gallery, Kasliq, Lebanon
1990 Nicole Belier Gallery, Paris, France
1991 Le Retro, Epreuve D'Artiste Gallery, Beirut, Lebanon
1994 A L Turath Al Arabi Gallery, Khobar, Saudi Arabia
1993 50 x 70 Gallery, Beirut, Lebanon
1996 Epreuve D’Artiste Gallery, Beirut, Lebanon
1998 Paintings: The War Years, American University of Beirut, Lebanon
1999 Epreuve D’Artiste Gallery, Beirut, Lebanon
2001 Janine Rubeiz Gallery, Beirut, Lebanon
2002 Green Art Gallery, Dubai, United Arab Emirates
2004 Janine Rubeiz Gallery, Beirut, Lebanon
2007 October 2007, Galerie M, Paris, France
2007 December 2007, Galerie Janine Rubeiz, Beirut, Lebanon
2011 November 2011, Salwa Zeidan Gallery, Abu Dhabi
2012 December 2012, Aida Cherfan Fine Art, Beirut, Lebanon
2015 June 2015, Aida Cherfan Fine Art, Beirut, Lebanon
2017 December 2017, Aida Cherfan Fine Art, Beirut, Lebanon

Selected group exhibitions
1966, 1974, 1982, 1986, 1987, 1989, 1992, 1994, 1995, 1996, 1997, 1998, 1999, 2000, 2003, 2006, 2007, 2008, 2009, 2010: Salon D’Automne, Sursock Museum, Beirut, Lebanon
1968, 1969, 1970: Outdoor Art, Beirut, Lebanon
1988, 1989,1990: Salon D’Automne, Paris, France
1994, 1995: Salon D’Automne, Saumur, France
1969 Pottery in Lebanon, Jafet Library. American University of Beirut. Beirut, Lebanon
1969 Exhibition of paintings by Lebanese artists, Hilton Hotel, Brussels, Belgium
1970 Exhibition of engravings, J.F.Kennedy Center, Beirut, Lebanon
1971 Art & Industry, Dar al Fan, Beirut, Lebanon
1980 Chahine Gallery, Beirut, Lebanon
1985 Faqra Hotel, Epreuve d’Artiste Gallery, Faqra, Lebanon
1985 Salon des Antiquaires, Orsero Gallery, Versailles, France
1987 Artists: Portraits & Autoportraits 1919-1987. Les Cimaises Gallery, Nahr el Kalb, Lebanon
1988 Women Painters, Lebanon, 3M Gallery, Jal el Dib, Lebanon
1989 Lebanon : The Artist’s View, Barbicon Center, London, United Kingdom
1989 Group Exhibit, Lebanese Art. Abu Dhabi. United Arab Emirates
1989 Liban: Le Regard des Peintres. Institut du Monde Arabe. Paris, France
1990 Al Baksami Gallery, Kuwait, Kuwait
1990 26th International Grand Prix of the Côte d’Azur, Cannes, France
1992 SAGA, Grand Palais, Paris, France
1992 Art Multiple, Düsseldorf, Presented by Laurier Dubé Editions. Germany
1992 Platform International at Strassi Gallery, Washington D.C, USA
1994 International Print Triennal, Alexandria, Egypt
1996 Green Art Gallery, Dubai
1999 Lebanese Painting Exhibition, Hotel Metropole, Monte-Carlo
2001 “Art Libanais”, Sursock Museum, Beirut, Lebanon
2003 Women by Women, The Institute for Women’s Studies in The Arab World, Lebanese American University. Beirut, Lebanon
2003 « Les Créateurs au Musée », Musée National, Beirut, Lebanon
2010 Contemparabia 2010, Beirut, Lebanon
2010 Convergence: New Art from Lebanon. American University Museum, Katzen Arts Center, Washington D.C.
2011 Rebirth. Beirut Exhibition Center, BIEL, Beirut, Lebanon.
2012 Start, Beirut Lebanon

Selected books
1982 Libano Text: Fulvio Roiter. Map illustration: Mouna Bassili Sehnaoui. Ed. Magnus Edizioni spa 1982
1999 Histoires et Mythes Illustre du Liban D'Antan Text: Nina Jidejian. Illustrations: Mouna Bassili Sehnaoui. Ed. Dar An Nahar 1999
2001 Professions & Callings Text: Fifi Abou Dib. Paintings: Mouna Bassili Sehnaoui. Ed. Dar An Nahar 2001
2008 The Fifth Day Text: Joseph Tarrab, Concept and Paintings: Mouna Bassili Sehnaoui, Ed. Dar An Nahar 2008
2011 Berytus The School of Law, Text: Nina Jidejian. Illustrations: Mouna Bassili Sehnaoui. Ed.Dar An Nahar 2011

References

External links
 Official Website of Mouna Bassili Sehnaoui

1945 births
Living people
Lebanese writers
Pop artists
Lebanese activists
Lebanese painters
Lebanese women painters
Lebanese women writers
21st-century women artists